Cañon is an unincorporated community and census-designated place in Sandoval County, New Mexico, United States. Its population was 327 as of the 2010 census. New Mexico State Road 4 passes through the community.

Geography

Demographics

Education
It is within the Jemez Valley Public Schools school district.

References

Census-designated places in New Mexico
Census-designated places in Sandoval County, New Mexico